Tangeli (also Romanized as Tangelī, Tangalī, Tanglī, and Tangolī) is a village in Atrak Rural District, Dashli Borun District, Gonbad-e Qabus County, Golestan Province, Iran. At the 2006 census, its population was 1,195, in 243 families. It is a border town, located near a crossing point to Turkmenistan.

References 

Populated places in Gonbad-e Kavus County